The 2022–23 season is the 119th season in the history of Bayer 04 Leverkusen and their 44th consecutive season in the top flight. The club are participating in the Bundesliga, DFB-Pokal, UEFA Champions League and UEFA Europa League.

Players

First-team squad

Players out on loan

Transfers

In

Out

Pre-season and friendlies

Competitions

Overall record

Bundesliga

League table

Results summary

Results by round

Matches 
The league fixtures were announced on 17 June 2022.

DFB-Pokal

UEFA Champions League

Group stage

The draw for the group stage was held on 25 August 2022.

UEFA Europa League

Knockout phase

Knockout round play-offs
The draw for the knockout round play-offs was held on 7 November 2022.

Round of 16
The draw for the round of 16 was held on 24 February 2023.

Quarter-finals
The draw for the quarter-finals was held on 17 March 2023.

Statistics

Appearances and goals

|-
! colspan=14 style=background:#dcdcdc; text-align:center| Goalkeepers
 
 
 

|-
! colspan=14 style=background:#dcdcdc; text-align:center| Defenders 
 

 

 
 

 
|-
! colspan=14 style=background:#dcdcdc; text-align:center| Midfielders

 
 

|-
! colspan=14 style=background:#dcdcdc; text-align:center| Forwards

 

 

 
|-
! colspan=14 style=background:#dcdcdc; text-align:center| Players transferred out during the season

Goalscorers

Last updated: 9 March 2023

References

Bayer 04 Leverkusen seasons
Bayer Leverkusen
Bayer 04 Leverkusen